J.D. Ryan was a Montana rancher and pioneer mining operator in Joshua Tree National Park.  The popular park destination Ryan Mountain is named after him.

Ryan was a wealthy rancher who in 1895, bought out one of the main mining interests in the area from Johnny Lang. He located a steam-powered mill, large at the time, near the Colorado River, then had it disassembled to move it to the Lang mine site. In this desert area, he was able to provide the steam for the mill by building a 3.5 mile long, 2" pipeline from wells at his local ranch, now a historic site known as Ryan House and Lost Horse Well, to a reservoir near the mill. Fuel to run the pumps piping the water up the needed  elevation gain was provided from burning trees from nearby desert mountains. The deforestation that resulted is still visible in 2014, in the denuded hills.

References

Joshua Tree National Park
Ranchers from Montana
Year of birth missing
Year of death missing